Za volantem nepřítel is a 1974 Czechoslovak drama film directed by Karel Steklý.

Cast
 Zdenka Burdová
 Antonín Hardt
 Jirí Havel
 Josef Hlinomaz as Driver
 Ladislav Krecmer
 Petr Pospíchal
 Libuše Řídelová as Mudroch's Wife
 Regina Rázlová as Zdena
 Petr Skarke as Chalus
 Frantisek Skripek as Milan
 Jarmila Svehlová
 Miloš Willig as Mudroch

References

External links
 

1974 films
1974 drama films
Czech drama films
Czechoslovak drama films
1970s Czech-language films
Films directed by Karel Steklý
1970s Czech films